For You may refer to:

Albums
 For You (Casey Donovan album), or the title song, 2004
 For You (Eddie Kendricks album), 1974
 For You (Fatin Shidqia album), 2013
 For You (Frankmusik album), 2015
 For You (Jo Stafford album), 2011
 For You (Philipp Kirkorov album), 2007
 For You (Prince album), or the title song, 1978
 For You (Selena Gomez album), 2014
 For You (Tatsuro Yamashita album), 1982
 For You (EP), by Luv', 1989
 For You, by Jack Russell, 2002
 For You, by Jackie DeShannon, 1967
 For You, by Khaya Mthethwa, 2012
 For You, or the title song, by L.T.D., 1983
 Gold Vol. 1, alternately titled For You, by Celine Dion, 1995

Songs
 "For You" (Bruce Springsteen song), 1973
 "For You" (The Calling song), 2003
 "For You" (Electronic song), 1996
 "For You" (Keith Urban song), 2012
 "For You" (Kenny Lattimore song), 1997
 "For You" (Liam Payne and Rita Ora song), 2018
 "For You" (Mariette song), 2018
 "For You" (The Outfield song), 1990
 "For You" (Ricky Nelson song), written by Joe Burke and Al Dubin, 1930; covered by Ricky Nelson, 1963
 "For You" (Staind song), 2001
 "For You" (Hikaru Utada song), 2000
 "For You: Kimi no Tame ni Dekiru Koto", by 2AM, 2012
 "Sheni gulistvis" (English: "For You"), by Iriao, 2018
 "For You", by All That Remains from The Order of Things
 "For You", by Anti-Nowhere League from We Are...The League
 "For You", by Azu from Two of Us
 "For You", by Baboon from Sausage
 "For You", by Barenaked Ladies from Everything to Everyone
 "For You", by Big Star from Third
 "For You", by BTS from Youth
 "For You", by Coldplay from Parachutes
 "For You", by Demi Lovato from Confident
 "For You", by Emerson, Lake & Palmer from Love Beach
 "For You", by Greg Kihn from Greg Kihn Again
 "For You", by HIM from Greatest Lovesongs Vol. 666
 "For You", by James Otto from Sunset Man
 "For You", by John Denver from Higher Ground
 "For You", by Journey from Time3
 "For You", by Killswitch Engage from As Daylight Dies
 "For You", by Manfred Mann from Chance
 "For You", by Michael W. Smith from Go West Young Man
 "For You", by My Dying Bride from Like Gods of the Sun
 "For You", by R. Kelly from 12 Play
 "For You", by Rae Morris from Unguarded
 "For You", by Six by Seven from The Things We Make
 "For You", by Split Enz from The Beginning of the Enz
 "For You", by Status Quo from Rockin' All Over the World
 "For You", by Stray Kids from SKZ2021
 "For You", by Tonight Alive from Underworld
 "For You", by Tracy Chapman from Tracy Chapman
 "For You", by Travis Tritt from No More Looking over My Shoulder
 "For You", by the Used from The Canyon
 "For You", by the Vamps from Night & Day
 "For You", by Why Don't We from The Good Times and the Bad Ones
 "For U", by Stephanie Mills from Born for This!

Other uses
 For You (film) or Men Ajlikom, a 2015 Lebanese biblical drama film
 For You (Italian TV channel), an Italian shopping and movie channel
 For You, a 2009 chamber opera by Michael Berkeley

See also 
 4U (disambiguation)
 This One's for You (disambiguation)